The 2013–14 Mississippi State Bulldogs basketball team will represent Mississippi State University in the 2013–14 college basketball season. The team's head coach is Rick Ray, in his second season at Mississippi State. The team plays their home games at the Humphrey Coliseum in Starkville, Mississippi, as a member of the Southeastern Conference.

Before the season

Departures
The Bulldogs lost three players from the 2012–13 squad.

Recruits

Season

Preseason
Head Coach Rick Ray announced the Bulldogs' non-conference schedule on July 3, 2013. The Bulldogs scheduled to open the season at home against Prairie View A&M, with other notable non-conference games including a trip to Utah State, a home game against Florida Gulf Coast, and participating in the Las Vegas Classic. Ray announced the team's conference slate on August 20, 2013. The Bulldogs' SEC schedule was highlighted by a home-and-home series with Kentucky, including traveling to Rupp Arena to open conference play on January 8. Other notable games included a visit from Florida to Humphrey Coliseum and a road date at LSU.

On December 30, 2013 it was announced that guard Andre Applewhite would transfer.

Departures

Roster

Schedule and results

|-
!colspan=9 style="background:#762123; color:#D1D5D8;"| Non-conference games

|-
!colspan=9 style="background:#762123; color:#D1D5D8;"| Conference games

|-
!colspan=9 style="background:#762123; color:#D1D5D8;"| SEC tournament

References

Mississippi State Bulldogs men's basketball seasons
Mississippi State
Mississippi State Bulldogs basketball
Mississippi State Bulldogs basketball